The 2021 Texas Longhorns football team represented the University of Texas at Austin during the 2021 NCAA Division I FBS football season. The Longhorns played their home games at Darrell K Royal–Texas Memorial Stadium in Austin, Texas. They are a charter member of the Big 12 Conference. They were led by first-year head coach Steve Sarkisian.

Previous season
The Longhorns finished the 2020 season with a 7–3 record, 5–3 in Big 12 play, defeating Colorado 55–23 in the Alamo Bowl to end their season ranked No. 19 overall.

Schedule

Regular season
The 2021 schedule consisted of 6 home games, 5 away games, and 1 neutral-site game in the regular season. The Longhorns hosted 3 non-conference games, against Louisiana, Arkansas, and Rice. Texas hosted Kansas State, Texas Tech, Kansas, and Oklahoma State, and Texas traveled to West Virginia, Baylor, TCU, and Iowa State in regular season conference play. Texas finished the season 5-7, 3-6 in conference play.

Offseason

Position key

Players

Transfers

Outgoing

Incoming

Coaching staff departures

2021 Recruits

Spring game
The spring game was played on Saturday, April 24

Sources:Stats

2021 NFL draft

Returning starters

Offense

Defense

Special teams

Preseason

Award watch lists 
Listed in the order that they were released

Big 12 media poll

Preseason All-Big 12 teams
Offense

1st team

Bijan Robinson – RB (Coaches, Media)

Defense

1st team

D’Shawn Jamison – DB (Coaches, Media)

Personnel

Coaching staff

Roster
Source:  
{| class="toccolours" style="text-align: left;"
|-
| colspan=11 style="; text-align: center"| 2021 Texas Longhorns football
|-
|valign="top"|

Quarterback
 1  Hudson Card –  Freshman (6'2, 200) 
 11  Casey Thompson – Junior (6'1, 200) 
 14  Charles Wright – Freshman (6'1, 200) 
16  Ben Ballard – Sophomore (5'11, 196) 
19  Cole Lourd – Freshman (6’2, 228) 

Running Back
 2  Roschon Johnson – Junior (6'2, 219) 
 5 Bijan Robinson – Sophomore (6’0, 214)  Injured
 7 Keilan Robinson – Sophomore (5’9, 183) 
23  Jarrett Smith – Junior (5'7, 206) 
24  Jonathon Brooks – Freshman (6'0, 199) 
27  Skyler Bonneau – Senior (6'1, 220) 
31  Anton Simieou –  Freshman (5’11, 209) 
32  Daniel Young – Senior (6’0, 220) 
33  Gabriel Watson – Senior (6'2, 235)

Wide Receiver
 4  Jordan Whittington – Sophomore (6'1, 203)   Injured
 6 Joshua Moore – Junior (6'1, 168) 
 8 Xavier Worthy - Freshman (6'1, 160) 
 9 Al’Vonte Woodard - Junior (6'2, 193) 
13 Jaden Alexis – Freshman (6’0, 188)   Injured
15 Marcus Washington – Junior (6'2, 191) 
16 Kelvontay Dixon –  Freshman (6'0, 179) 
21 Troy Omeire –  Freshman (6'3, 220)   Injured 
30 Dajon Harrison –  Freshman (5’10, 165) 
39 Montrell Estell– Senior (6’1, 196) 
82 Kartik Akihal – Junior (6'2, 192) 
83 Kai Money – Junior (6'0, 179) 
84  Travis West – Junior (6'0, 174) 
86  Paxton Anderson –  Freshman (6'4, 215) 
87  Parker Alford – Sophomore (5’10, 180) 
88  Casey Cain – Freshman (6’3, 192) 

Tight End
 3  Ja'Tavion Sanders – Freshman (6'4, 256) 
18  Jared Wiley – Junior (6'7, 251) 
42  Nathan Hatter – Sophomore (6'2, 233) 
80  Cade Brewer – Senior (6'4, 243) 
81  Juan Davis – Freshman (6'4, 226) 
85  Gunnar Helm – Freshman (6'5, 238) 
89  Brayden Liebrock – Sophomore (6'4, 228)   Injured

Kicker/Punter
 8  Ryan Bujcevski – P – Senior (6'0, 177) 
17  Cameron Dicker – K – Senior (6'1, 216) 
38  Erwin Von Nacher - K -  Freshman (6'1, 167) 
45  Bert Auburn - K - Freshman (6'0, 172) 
49  Isaac Pearson - P - Freshman (6'2, 224) 
96  Gabriel Lozano – K – Sophomore (6'0, 172) 

|width="25"| 
|valign="top"|	

Offensive Line
57  Christian Rizzi – Freshman (5’11, 215) 
64  Michael Balis – Sophomore (6'5, 287) 
65  Jake Majors –  Freshman (6'3, 310) 
66  Chad Wolf – Sophomore (6'3, 270) 
67  Tope Imade – Senior (6'6, 361) 
68  Derek Kerstetter - Senior (6'5, 310) 
69  Andrej Karic -  Freshman (6'4, 300) 
70  Christian Jones – Junior (6'6, 314) 
71  Logan Parr –  Freshman (6'4, 308) 
72  Tyler Johnson – Sophomore (6'6, 325) 
73  Isaiah Hookfin  – Sophomore (6'5, 299) 
74  Rafiti Ghirmai – Junior (6'5, 296) 
75  Junior Angilau – Junior (6'6, 319) 
76  Hayden Conner – Freshman (6'5, 332) 
77  Jaylen Garth –  Freshman (6'5, 309) 
78  Denzel Okafor – Senior (6'4, 322)   Injured
79  Max Merril – Freshman (6'4, 285) 

Defensive Line
3  Jacoby Jones -  Senior (6'4, 255)   Injured
32  Prince Dorbah  –  Freshman (6'3, 234) 
43  Chris Hannon – Junior (6'2, 229) 
45  Vernon Broughton  –  Freshman (6'4, 306) 
50  Jordon Thomas  – Freshman (6'3, 273) 
55  David Abiara  – Freshman (6'4, 256) 
88  Barryn Sorrell – Freshman (6’3, 246) 
90  Byron Murphy II – Freshman (6'1, 297) 
91  Sawyer Goram-Welch –  Freshman (6'4, 301) 
92  Myron Warren – Sophomore (6'2, 285) 
93  T'Vondre Sweat – Junior (6'4, 335) 
95  Alfred Collins – Sophomore (6'5, 302) 
97  Patrick Bayouth – Sophomore (6'4, 280) 
98  Moro Ojomo – Junior (6'3, 286) 
99  Keondre Coburn – Junior (6'2, 346) 

Deep Snapper
43  Zach Edwards – Junior (5’11, 211) 
47  Chandler Kelehan – Junior (6’1, 195) 
54  Justin Mader – Senior (6'2, 236) 

|width="25"| 
|valign="top"|

Linebacker
 0  DeMarvion Overshown  –  Senior (6'4, 223) 
 6  Ben Davis  –  Senior (6'4, 236) 
13  Marcus Tillman, Jr. – Sophomore (6'1, 239) 
18  Ovie Oghoufo – Junior (6'3, 237) 
29  Jaden Hullaby –  Freshman (6'2, 223) 
30  Devin Richardson – Junior (6'3, 233) 
33  David Gbenda – Sophomore (6'0, 224) 
35  Terrence Cooks II – Freshman (6'2, 220) 
37  Morice Blackwell Jr. – Freshman (6'1, 203) 
40  Ayodele Adeoye  – Junior (6’1, 240) 
41  Jaylan Ford – Sophomore (6'2, 230) 
42  D.J. Harris Jr. – Freshman (6’2, 226) 
46  Ray Thornton – Senior (6'3, 238) 
47  Luke Brockermeyer – Junior (6'3, 225) 
51  Marshall Landwehr  – Freshman (6'0, 218) 
52  Jett Bush – Junior (6'2, 236) 
53  Carlton Smith – Senior (6'3, 237) 

Defensive Back
 1 Chris Adimora – Junior (6'1, 204) 
 4  Darion Dunn – Senior (6'1, 192) 
 5  D’Shawn Jamison – Senior (5'10, 184) 
 9  Josh Thompson – Senior (6’0, 191) 
11  Anthony Cook – Senior (6’1, 191) 
14  Brenden Schooler – Senior (6’2, 206) 
19  Ishmael Ibraheem – Freshman (6'1, 160)    Injured
21  Kitan Crawford – Sophomore (5’11, 196) 
23  Jahdae Barron – Sophomore (5’11, 186) 10px|Injured Injured
24  Marques Caldwell – Sophomore (6'1, 198) 
25  B.J. Foster – Senior (6'2, 199) 
26  Christian Tschauner – Sophomore (5'11, 188) 
27  JD Coffey III – Freshman (6’0, 183) 
28  Jerrin Thompson – Sophomore (6’0, 188) 
31  Jamier Johnson – Freshman (6'0, 166) 
36  Michael Taaffe – Freshman (6'0, 182) 
37  Doak Wilson – Sophomore (6'0, 190) 
38  Tremayne Prudhomme – Junior (6'1, 187) 
39  Turner Symonds – Junior (6’1, 178) 
44  Tannahill Love –  Freshman (5’11, 213) 
44  Tyler Owens – Junior (6'2, 203) 
49  Thatcher Milton – Freshman (5’10, 181) 

Legend
 (C) Team captain
 (S) Suspended
 (I) Ineligible
  Injured
  Redshirt
|}

Depth chartTrue FreshmanGame summaries

vs. No. 23 Louisiana

Sources:Stats

at Arkansas

Sources:Stats

vs. Rice

Sources:Stats

vs. Texas Tech

Sources:Stats

at TCU

Sources:Stats

vs. No. 6 Oklahoma

Sources:Stats

vs. No. 12 Oklahoma State

Sources:Stats

at No. 16 Baylor

Sources:Stats

at Iowa State

Sources:Stats

vs. Kansas

Sources:Stats

at West Virginia

Sources:Stats

vs. Kansas State

Sources:Stats

This was the fifth consecutive win for Texas over Kansas State. With two field goals from Longhorn Cameron Dicker, Texas pulled ahead to win.  The final score of the game was Texas 22, Kansas State 17.

Although Texas won the game and broke a six-game losing streak (its worst since 1956), they ended the season at 5 wins and 7 losses (3-6 in the conference) and are not bowl eligible. However, it is possible they could receive an invitation if there are not enough teams with six wins to fill all 82 bowl game openings. Kansas State's regular season record concluded at 7-5 (4-5 in conference) and expect a bowl game invitation on December 5.

Statistics

Offense

Defense
 

Key: POS: Position, SOLO: Solo Tackles, AST: Assisted Tackles, TOT: Total Tackles, TFL: Tackles-for-loss, SACK: Quarterback Sacks, INT: Interceptions, BU: Passes Broken Up, PD: Passes Defended, QBH: Quarterback Hits, FR: Fumbles Recovered, FF: Forced Fumbles, BLK: Kicks or Punts Blocked, SAF: Safeties, TD : Touchdown

Special teams

Awards and honors

 Big 12 Conference Awards First Team Big 12 All-ConferenceBig 12 Conference Offensive Freshman of the Year''

Rankings

References

Texas
Texas Longhorns football seasons
Texas Longhorns football